was a village located in Hidaka District, Wakayama Prefecture, Japan.

As of 2003, the village had an estimated population of 6,561 and a density of 69.66 persons per km2. The total area was 94.18 km2.

On October 1, 2004, Minabegawa was merged into the expanded town of Minabe and no longer exists as an independent municipality.

External links
Official Minabe town website (in Japanese)

Dissolved municipalities of Wakayama Prefecture